The Vagri (Vaghri, Waghri or Baghri) (Gujarati:) are a tribe and caste found in the states of Rajasthan and Gujarat in India the province of Sindh in Pakistan.

History
During the British Raj, the Vagri were listed under the Criminal Tribes Act of 1871 as a tribe "addicted to the systematic commission of non-bailable offences." In 1952, they were "denotified", meaning that they were no longer listed as criminals.

Present circumstances

In India
In India, the Vagri are mainly located in the Gujarat District. Like many other Gujarati Hindu communities, they are endogamous but maintain gotra exogamy. Their main clans are the Badgujar, Vaghela, Solanki, Charan and Godara. They are a landless community, although a few do hold small plots of land. The Vagri are also cattle breeders and cattle traders and sell their cattle at the famous Pushkar cattle fair. They have an effective caste council, which acts as a quasi-judicial body and deals with intra-community disputes. It is headed by a heredity office holder, known as a Patel. They are a Hindu community, with their main tribal deities being Bahuchara Mata, Charbayu Mata (Chandika Mata), Shitla Mata, Hadak Mata, Khodiyar Mata, Mogal Mata, and Meldi Mata. Also, follow Pavani (Maa Kali), Mata Shakti, Runvali Mata (Devi of dessert), Bhutdi Maa, bahuchraji maa there are others also devis in devipujak (vagri) community like jungleni Devi for shikaris, Vahanvati maa for boaters and sailors Mata jogni to fight against witches and black magic. Many other devis follow among there sub caste.

In Gujarat, the Vaghri are found mainly in the districts of Sabarkantha, Banaskantha, Panchmahal, Kheda, and Ahmedabad. They speak Marwari among themselves and Gujarati with outsiders. Their main sub-divisions are Mandariya, Moladiya, Ambaliya, Halvadiya, Moplipara, Kavithiya, Khakhodiya, Talsaniya,Kharvi, Kajania, Ughrejia, Mithapara, Kaltaniya, Khavadiya, Kumarkhania, Navadiya, Surela, Sovasiya, Jakvadiya, Godhakiya, Rafukiya, Butiya, Chekhaliya, Gorava, Kundhiya, Bhojaviya, Bhirbhadiya, Bhochiya, and Sathliya among others. They are endogamous and maintain gotra exogamy. The Vaghris are landless and depend on agricultural labour. They are also involved in raising poultry, sheep, goat, and cattle, as well as selling vegetables. In Gujarat, the Vagri are Hindu, and their main tribal deities are Vihot, Narsingabir, Kalika and Meldi mata. vagri This is a tribe who gives animal sacrifice to their goddess.

In Pakistan
The Vagri in Pakistan are found mainly in the districts of Umerkot and Tharparkar. They are landless, and have been subject to discrimination at the hands of the locally powerful Sodha Rajput community.

A recent study showed that the majority of scheduled caste population of Pakistan, which includes the Vagri, are practically landless. The survey conducted showed that in Tharparkar, Umerkot, Rahim Yar Khan, and Bahawalpur districts revealed that an overwhelming majority of 83 percent Scheduled Caste population did not own even a small piece of land. The land ownership by the remaining 17 percent is also very small as 90 percent of the Scheduled Caste land owners have a very small piece of land between one and five acres. Like those in India, the Pakistan Vagri are Hindu, and speak both Sindhi and their own language, Bagri, which distantly related to Rajasthani.

References

Social groups of Rajasthan
Social groups of Sindh
Dalit communities
Sindhi tribes
Hindu communities of Pakistan
Denotified tribes of India
Sindhi tribes in India